Plach Yeremiyi is a Ukrainian rock band from Lviv, Ukraine. The band was actually formed in February 1990, but the two most  constant musicians - Taras Chubay and Vsevolod Dyachyshyn have played together since 1984 in the band Tsyklon (Циклон).

Plach Yeremiyi songs are usually serious, philosophical poems many composed by lead man Taras Chubay's father Hryhoriy Chubay and given a contemporary rock sound. The group's name comes from Taras Chubay's father's Magnum opus Plach Yeremiyi posthumously published in 1999.  The music in the songs sounds hard, then changes to an easy ballad and again explodes, overfilled by emotions. All this has a specific "Lviv" colouring.

Albums
Dveri kоtri naspravdi ye... (Двері, котрі насправді є, The doors, which indeed exist) (1993)
Nay bude vse yak ye (Най буде все як є..., Leave it all as it is) (1995)
Khata moya (Хата моя, My house) (1997)
Dobre (Добре, It's good) (1998)
Ya pidu v daleki hory (Я піду в далекі гори, I will go to the distant hills) (1999)
Yak ya spala na seni (Як я спала на сені, As I slept on hay) (2000)

Compilations
Rock legends of Ukraine (Рок-легенди України)

Taras Chubay with friends
Nashe rizdvo (Наше різдво, Our Christmas)
Nashi partyzany (Наші партизани, Our partisans)
Nash Ivasyuk (Наш Івасюк, Our Ivasyuk) (2003)

Taras Chubay
Svitlo i spovid'. (Світло і Сповідь, Light and Confession) (2003)

References

External links
Plach Jeremiji CDs on www.umka.com.ua internet store
Photo gallery on ukrcenter.com

Soviet rock music groups
Ukrainian rock music groups
Musical groups from Lviv